Marco Innocenti (born 16 August 1978) is an Italian sport shooter who competed in the 2000 Summer Olympics and in the 2004 Summer Olympics.

References

External links

1978 births
Living people
Italian male sport shooters
Trap and double trap shooters
Olympic shooters of Italy
Shooters at the 2000 Summer Olympics
Shooters at the 2004 Summer Olympics
Shooters at the 2016 Summer Olympics
Olympic silver medalists for Italy
Olympic medalists in shooting
Medalists at the 2016 Summer Olympics
People from Prato
Sportspeople from the Province of Prato
21st-century Italian people